Rakuten Kobo Inc., or simply Kobo, is a Canadian company that sells ebooks, audiobooks, ereaders and tablet computers. It is headquartered in Toronto, Ontario, and is a subsidiary of the Japanese ecommerce conglomerate Rakuten. The name Kobo is an anagram of book.

History 
Kobo originated as Shortcovers, a cloud eReading service launched by the Canadian bookstore chain Indigo Books and Music in February 2009. In December 2009, Indigo renamed the service Kobo and spun it off into an independent company. Indigo remained the majority owner, with investors including Borders Group, Cheung Kong Holdings, and REDgroup Retail taking minority stakes. , Indigo Books & Music owned 58% of Kobo Inc. Rakuten acquired the company from these owners in January 2012. On 23 May 2016, Waterstones announced it had sold its eBook business to Rakuten Kobo Inc., and as of 14 June 2016, users were required to access their eBooks via Kobo's eBook site.

During the COVID pandemic, Kobo worked with governments, publishers, and retail partners to provide more than 20 million free books through the “Stay Home and Read” program. The company reported that romance and mystery novels continued to be bestsellers during the pandemic, and that there was a rise in books for kids and young adults.

Products

E-readers 

Kobo produces several eReaders with ePaper screens. The first Kobo eReader was introduced in 2010. The product lineup went on to consist of the base model Kobo Touch, the smaller Kobo Mini, and the Kobo Glo, which has an illuminated screen. On the higher end, the Kobo Aura; the Kobo Aura HD, which added a higher-resolution screen, the waterproof Kobo Aura H2O; and the waterproof Kobo Forma which added physical buttons and a choice of orientation. In 2018, the company released the Kobo Clara HD as another 6-inch option (the Aura Edition 2 being the first).

In 2019, the Kobo Libra H2O was released. Kobo partnered with Hotel Viu Milan to create a Reader in Residence program and for a month, the Kobo Libra H2O was placed in hotel rooms for guests to use. In 2020, Kobo introduced the Kobo Nia, an entry level eReader to replace the discontinued Kobo Aura. In 2021, Kobo introduced the Kobo Elipsa, an eReader and smart notebook that allows users to write on the screen.

These eReaders compete with the Amazon Kindle and Barnes & Noble Nook product lines.

Kobo's eReaders use Wi-Fi to sync a user's book collection and bookmarks with Kobo's cloud service, which can also be accessed from Kobo eReading apps for Windows and macOS computers, Android and iOS smartphones.

Tablets 
Kobo produced the Kobo Arc family of Android tablets, which it introduced in 2012 and refreshed in 2013. It previously sold the Kobo Vox, a 7-inch Android tablet released in 2011. In 2014, Kobo discontinued the Arc tablets and did not develop another one.

Applications 
Kobo offers free reading applications for Windows and MacOS computers, Android and iOS smartphones. In June 2015, Kobo received a Top Developer badge in the Google Play store. In 2017, Kobo acquired Shelfie, an app that organizes personal libraries.

Kobo Plus Subscription Service 
Kobo Plus is the company’s unlimited audiobook and eBook subscription service. It was first released in the Netherlands and Belgium in 2017, and then expanded to Canada in 2020. In 2021, Kobo signed an agreement with LeYa, a Portuguese publishing group, and launched Kobo Plus e_LeYa, which made exclusive content available in Portugal.

As of May 2021, Kobo Plus offered 599,000 eBooks and 94,000 audiobooks. Books are available in a number of languages. Readers can choose to subscribe to only eBooks, or to expand the service with Kobo Plus Listening, which includes audiobooks.

Store and publishing 
Kobo's bookstore was opened in 2009. Content sold on the Kobo Bookstore include eBooks, Audiobooks, newspapers, and magazines. The majority of titles are sold in the open ePub format, albeit with DRM.

Several digital book stores have closed down and transferred their users to Kobo's bookstore. They include the defunct Borders eBook Store, as well as the Sony Reader Store. Both have provided tools for users to migrate purchases and information to Kobo's offering.

On 17 July 2012, Kobo launched a self-publishing platform called Kobo Writing Life (KWL). Key features of Kobo Writing Life include "deep analytics", allowing authors to track sales in real time; a "learning center" to guide newcomers in digital publishing; and allowing an author to sell books globally.

2019, KWL began offering self-publishing opportunities for Audiobooks.

Emerging Writer Prize 
The Kobo Emerging Writer Prize awards three first-time Canadian authors with CAD $10,000 each. The awards are given in three categories, Literary Fiction, Nonfiction, and Genre Fiction, with the genre selection changing each year. Traditionally published, and self-published books are eligible, and authors receive marketing and communications support during their winning year.

In 2021, the award’s seventh year, the winning authors were: Michelle Good, author of Five Little Indians (Fiction); Eternity Martis, author of They Said This Would Be Fun (Nonfiction); and Emily Hepditch, author of The Woman in the Attic (Mystery).

At the same time as the Libra 2, the Kobo Sage was also introduced as a new top model. It has an 8" E-Ink Carta 1200 display with a resolution of 1440 × 1920 pixels and 32 GB internal memory. A Bluetooth module and a USB-C port have also been installed. In addition, as with the Elipsa, it is possible to capture notes on the device with a stylus.

Sales and market share 
Kobo sells its devices online and through physical retail channels. The company's strategic partnerships have included Cheung Kong Holdings, W H Smith, Whitcoulls, FNAC, Livraria Cultura, and Eslite Bookstore. Kobo partnered with Australian online bookseller Booktopia and also has a program partnering with independent bookstores to sell their devices.

In 2012, Wired named Kobo as the "only global competitor to Amazon [in the eBook market]" with over 20% of the worldwide market.

Kobo Inc. released eBook reading data collected from over 21 million readers worldwide in 2014. Some of the data said that only 45% of UK readers finished the bestselling eBook The Goldfinch.

As of August 2018, Amazon's Kindle eReader had an 83.6% share of the U.S. eReader market while Kobo had a 13.4% share.

Venture with Walmart
In 2018, the company and Walmart contracted to allow the latter to sell Kobo audiobooks, eBooks and eReaders in the U.S. This was the first venture into eBooks for the retailer which also began selling the Kobo eReaders. Walmart installed eReader stations in over 1,000 stores. Their eBook Web site was listing over 6 million titles. The retailer also began to offer subscriptions for audiobooks at a monthly fee.

Venture with Bol.com
In the Netherlands, Bol.com is contracted to sell Kobo audiobooks, eBooks and eReaders.

References

External links 

 

 
Ebook sources
Ebook suppliers
Audiobook companies and organizations
Book selling websites
Bookstores of Canada
Bookstores of Japan
Bookstores of Portugal
Bookstores of Germany
Bookstores of India
Bookstores of Ireland
Bookstores of the United States
Bookshops of the United Kingdom
Bookshops of Australia
Bookshops of New Zealand
Bookshops of Brazil
Bookstores of France
Bookstores in the Netherlands
Canadian brands
Companies based in Toronto
Canadian companies established in 2009
Consumer electronics retailers of Canada
Electronics companies of Canada
Internet properties established in 2009
Online retailers of Canada
Publishing companies established in 2009
Rakuten
Self-publishing companies
2009 establishments in Ontario
2012 mergers and acquisitions
Canadian subsidiaries of foreign companies